Carl Gottlob Cramer (3 March 1758 – 7 June 1817) was a popular German writer of heroic romance. His works include Friedrich von Eisenbart und Baron Sturmdrang, Ritter Euros und seine Freunde, and Freuden und Leiden des edlen Baron Just Friedrich auf der Semmelburg.  Carl Maria von Weber's opera Peter Schmoll und seine Nachbarn was written to a libretto by Josef Türk after Cramer's popular novel of the same name.

References

Sources

 
 
 

1758 births
1817 deaths
18th-century German writers
18th-century German male writers